Matti Efer "Efraim" Harju (4 June 1889 – 17 July 1977) was a Finnish middle-distance runner. He competed in the men's 1500 metres at the 1912 Summer Olympics.

References

1889 births
1977 deaths
Athletes (track and field) at the 1912 Summer Olympics
Finnish male middle-distance runners
Olympic athletes of Finland
Place of birth missing
Olympic cross country runners